Bhadra (भद्र) is a Sanskrit word and also the name of many Hindu mythological characters.

Bhadra may also refer to:

Films
Bhadra (2005 film), a Telugu film
Bhadra (2011 film), a Kannada film
Khaleja, a 2010 Telugu film dubbed in Tamil as Bhadra

People
Ashok Bhadra, Indian composer
Birendra Krishna Bhadra (1905–1991), Indian broadcaster

Places
 Badhra, Haryana, India
Badhra sub-district
Badhra (Haryana Assembly constituency)
 Bhadra, Rajasthan, India
Bhadra (Rajasthan Assembly constituency)
 Bhadra Dam, Karnataka, India
 Bhadra Fort, Ahmedabad, Gujarat, India
 Bhadra River, Karnataka, India
 Bhadra Wildlife Sanctuary, Karnataka, India

Other uses
Bhadra (Krishna's wife), an unrelated Hindu goddess
Bhadra (Hindu calendar), a month in the Hindu calendar
Bhadra (Nepali calendar), a month in the Nepali calendar
Neope bhadra, a nymphalid butterfly
 Bhadra, a character in the 2014 video game Far Cry 4